L'assoluto naturale (internationally released as He and She and She and He) is a 1969 Italian drama film directed by Mauro Bolognini.

The plot focuses on a mysterious romance involving an uninhibited woman (Koscina) and a dour photographer (Harvey), shot in strange modernist interiors and abstract "sports car on a highway to nowhere" exteriors.

The work of cinematographer Ennio Guarnieri in this film has been referred to as "one of the cornerstones of Italian photography in the sixties".

Cast 
 Laurence Harvey: He
 Sylva Koscina: She
 Isa Miranda: Mother 
 Felicity Mason: Aunt
 Guido Mannari: Mechanic

References

External links

1969 films
1960s Italian-language films
English-language Italian films
1960s English-language films
Films directed by Mauro Bolognini
Italian drama films
Films scored by Ennio Morricone
1960s multilingual films
Italian multilingual films
1960s Italian films